The 2021 Boucles de la Mayenne was the 46th edition of the Boucles de la Mayenne road cycling stage race, which took place between 27 and 30 May 2021 in the Mayenne department in northwestern France.

The race had been promoted from category-2.1 race to a category-2.Pro race after the 2019 season and was due to be a part of the inaugural edition of the UCI ProSeries, but after the 2020 edition was cancelled due to the COVID-19 pandemic, it made its UCI ProSeries debut in 2021, while also still being a part of the 2021 UCI Europe Tour.

Teams 

UCI WorldTeams

 
 
 
 
 

UCI ProTeams

 
 
 
 
 
 
 
 
 
 
 
 
 
 

UCI Continental Teams

Route

Stages

Stage 1 
27 May 2021 – Le Genest-Saint-Isle to Ambrières-les-Vallées,

Stage 2 
28 May 2021 – Vaiges to Évron,

Stage 3 
29 May 2021 – Saint-Berthevin to Craon,

Stage 4 
30 May 2021 – Méral to Laval,

Classification leadership table 

 On stage 2, Diego Rubio, who was second in the points classification, wore the green jersey, because first placed Philipp Walsleben wore the yellow jersey as the leader of the general classification.
 On stage 4, Kristoffer Halvorsen, who was second in the points classification, wore the green jersey, because first placed Arnaud Démare wore the yellow jersey as the leader of the general classification.

Final classification standings

General classification

Points classification

Mountains classification

Young rider classification

Team classification

Notes

References

Sources

External links
 

2021
Boucles de la Mayenne
Boucles de la Mayenne
Boucles de la Mayenne
Boucles de la Mayenne